Liadotaulius is an extinct genus of caddisflies. It is currently (tentatively) placed in the family Philopotamidae, though it has previously been placed in the extinct families Necrotauliidae and Dysoneuridae.

Species
†Liadotaulius borealis (Novokhonov & Sukatsheva, 1995)
†Liadotaulius daohugouensis Wu & Huang, 2012
†Liadotaulius korujensis (Sukatsheva, 1990)
†Liadotaulius limus Zhang, Shih & Ren, 2016
†Liadotaulius maior (Handlirsch, 1906)
†Liadotaulius sharategensis (Ivanov & Novokshonov, 1995)
†Liadotaulius shewjensis (Sukatsheva, 1990)

References

†
Jurassic insects
Prehistoric insect genera